Hubei Pocket(湖北包圍戰) was a battle of encirclement that took place between late July and early December 1864, near the end of Taiping Rebellion, in the Hubei, China. It was, for all intents and purposes, the last desperate attempt in Taiping Rebellion's war effort to win the war, as more than 200,000 troops were taken prisoner, but a remainder of 19,000 Taiping troops led by Lai Wenguang broke out and marched into southern Henan and combined with 150,000 troops from the Nien Rebellion.

References

Hubei 1864
Hubei 1864
Hubei 1864
History of Hubei
Green Standard Army
Nian Rebellion